Falstaff in Vienna is a 1940 German musical comedy film directed by Leopold Hainisch and starring Hans Nielsen, Gusti Wolf and Paul Hörbiger. It portrays the life of the nineteenth century composer Otto Nicolai, known for works such as The Merry Wives of Windsor.

Cast
In alphabetical order
 Wolf Albach-Retty as Robert von Weitenegg
 Ernst Benzinger as Prompter at the premiere
 Erna Berger as Soprano
 Helmut Berndsen as Falstaff actor
 Luise Bethke-Zitzmann as Gardenfrau Mizzi's in Berlin
 Eduard Bornträger as Theatre box attendant
 Julius Brandt as Clerk Pokorny
 Theo Brandt
 Gaston Briese as Stage manager of the Royal Opera House Berlin
 Curt Cappi as Organ grinder
 Michele Danton as Italian street hawker
 Karl Etlinger as Senior clark Mödlinger
 Hugo Flink
 Senta Foltin as Demoiselle Leonie
 Charles Francois as Guest in the theatre box
 Hans Göbel as Singer
 Harry Hardt as Policeman
 Franz Heigl as Schani Habrechtsberger, journeyman at Sturm's
 Karl Hellmer as Schanderl, Theatre attendant
 Fritz Hinz-Fabricius as Theatre porter
 Lizzi Holzschuh as Resi Sturm
 William Huch as Servant at Berliner Opera
 Paul Hörbiger as Court tailor Josef Sturm
 Bruno Hübner as Second Kapellmeister Schlögl
 Eduard Kandl as Bass
 Roselotte Kettmann as Woman
 Wolfgang Kieling as Loisl – Apprentice to master Sturm
 Rudolf Kölling
 Otto Lange
 Herrmann Luddecke
 Hans Nielsen as Otto Nicolai
 Hans Obermanns as Singer
 Paul Otto as Count Redern, General Director of the Royal theatres in Berlin
 Marie-Louise Schilp as Mrs Reich (Mistress Page) – Soprano
 Ingeborg Schmidt-Stein as Mrs Fluth (Mistress Ford)
 Walter Schramm-Duncker as Theatre guest
 Carla Spletter as Soprano
 Gretl Theimer as Kathi, Girl at Sturm's
 Max Vierlinger
 Gustav Waldau as Count Sedlnitzky
 Ludwig Windisch as Singer
 Hans Wocke as Baritone
 Gusti Wolf as Mizzi Stadlmeier
 Aribert Wäscher as Theatre director Pietro Balocchino

References

Bibliography

External links 
 
 Falstaff in Wien, filmportal.de

1940 films
Films of Nazi Germany
German musical comedy films
German historical comedy films
1940 musical comedy films
1940s historical comedy films
1940s German-language films
Films directed by Leopold Hainisch
Films set in Vienna
Films set in the 19th century
German biographical films
1940s biographical films
Biographical films about musicians
Films about classical music and musicians
German black-and-white films
Tobis Film films
Cultural depictions of German men
Cultural depictions of classical musicians
1940s historical musical films
German historical musical films
1940s German films